Bahrain has been connected to the internet since 1995, and made it readily available to its citizens. The country's domain suffix is '.bh'. A 2004 study showed a liberal filtering system is used in Bahrain, one which can be easily bypassed, however more recent events have shown more sophisticated and pervasive filtering. In January 2009, Bahrain has started blocking a vastly increased number of sites through the Information Affairs Authority (IAA).  The new filtering has had a noticeable impact in internet access speeds for all traffic.

In 2010, there were about 694,000 internet users in Bahrain, or 55% of the population. According to the World Bank, over 90% of the population is connected to the internet between 2010 and 2014. This later rose to 96.4% (an estimated 1.29 million online) in 2015, thus making Bahrain the country with the highest internet penetration percentage in the Middle East.

Internet penetration and usage
The growth in fixed telephone lines and the Internet has made Bahrain a regional information and communications technology leader. The country's connectivity score (a statistic which measures both Internet access and fixed and mobile telephone lines) is 210.4 percent per person, while the regional average in Arab States of the Persian Gulf is 135.37 percent. The number of Bahraini Internet users has risen from 40,000 in 2000 to 250,000 in 2008, or from 5.95 to 33 percent of the population. The telecom market witnessed a remarkable development in November 2008 when Mena Telecom launched its nationwide WiMAX network, a service that provides high speed wireless voice and data services.

To encourage creativity in domestic online content, in 2005 Bahrain launched an e-content award organised by the eGovernment Authority in Bahrain and the Bahrain Internet Society. The goal of the award is to select quality online content and to promote creativity and innovation in the development of new media applications in Bahrain.

Bahrain's online community is small but dynamic. As of January 2008, there were over 535 websites based in Bahrain, focusing on 25 different themes (e.g., public forums); 59 websites for governmental organizations; and about 200 blogs, the majority of which are anonymous blogs. Internet users in Bahrain use the Internet to debate sensitive issues and to exchange content that is not available in the traditional media. The authorities have blocked a number of news, religion, human rights, and humour Web sites run by Bahrainis and by non-Bahrainis, but users manage to access them using proxies.

Bahrain's telecom market is regulated by the Telecommunications Regulatory Authority (TRA), which was established by Legislative Decree No. 48 of 2002 to protect the interests of subscribers and users and to promote effective and fair competition among established and new licensed operators. As of 2008, the TRA has licensed 22 Internet Service Providers, the largest of which is Batelco.

Internet Service Providers in Bahrain (ISP)

Ascentech Telecom: Value added Telecommunications company established in 2005.  Services include International calling cards, online SMS, cloud services, as well as business voice and data services.
Bahrain Internet Exchange (BIX): Body established by government decree to connect Internet Service Providers, in order to increase local traffic and content, as well as reduce the cost of purchasing international bandwidth.
Batelco: Regional telecommunications company specialising in mobile, national and international telephony, business network services, Internet and satellite services etc.
Etisalcom: offers ETISL IP telephony, More international calling cards, national & international connectivity, Internet, hosting etc.
Inet Email: E-mail service provided by Bahrain Telecommunications Company
Kalaam Telecom
Lightspeed Communications: Lightspeed Communications is Bahrain's first alternative fixed-line telecommunications operator. Services offered includes voice & Internet ; head office is in Almoayyed Tower in Seef; strategic partners include Jordan Telecom. Lightspeed was bought over by Kalaam Telecom.
Mena Telecom: Telecommunications company based in Manama; services: carrier pre-select, two-way satellite, broadband applications, international prepaid calling cards etc. Mena Telecom is now being acquired by VIVA Bahrain
North Star Communications: Providers of Internet, IP Telephony services; Pre-paid & Post-paid International Call services,  Internet leased lines, ADSL services, GPS Vehicle Tracking, Website development etc.
Nuetel Communications: offers services including voice, Internet & television over a single broadband connection; head office is in Amwaj Islands; strategic partners include Cisco Systems & British Telecom.
Prism International Solutions: wholesaler and retailer of data and communication products like Switches, Routers, Wireless, IP Telephone, Media Converter, Copper and Fiber Products, Communication and Server Cabinets, Data Center Products, Tools and Testing Equipment
Rapid Telecom: Provides Dedicated / Broadband Internet, Leased lines over Fiber Optics as well as Microwave, National and international telephony. 
Viacloud: A multi-national telecom operator providing voice, data and value-added services in the Middle East & Bahrain. They provide business, residential voice and data services along with international calling cards.
VIVA Bahrain: Providers of mobile phone services in Bahrain; part of The Saudi Telecommunication Group; provides call, messaging, Internet, roaming, Blackberry services etc.
Zain: Regional telecommunications company specialising in mobile, national and international telephony, business network services, Internet and satellite services.

Surveillance and filtering

The Ministry of Information has established a special unit which monitors Web sites for possible blocking. The government has indicated an interest in setting up a commission to monitor the press and Internet content to "report any incitement to confessionnalism." Government efforts to monitor Web sites have also been confirmed by media reports that cite an official source saying that in addition to Web sites being monitored on a daily basis, the use of circumvention techniques to update banned Web sites is also being watched. Telecommunication Regulatory Authority - Kingdom of Bahrain, “Legislative Decree no. 48 of 2002 Promulgating the Telecommunications Law,”

Results from first 2008-2009 test runs found limited blocking of pornographic and LGBT content and proxy and anonymizing services. However, after the January 2009 Ministerial decree, which ordered ISPs to implement an official filtering system, ONI found that the filtering of content in officially prohibited categories has become pervasive, which is an indication that the ISPs have started to use a commercial filtering system. Also, the ISPs have started to serve an explicit blockpage with a reference to the Ministerial decree.

Mid-February 2011, start of the Bahraini uprising, Internet traffic dropped by 20% due to aggressive government filtering.

Arrested bloggers
On April 9, 2011, blogger Zakariya Rashid Hassan al-Ashiri died in prison after being tortured. He had been arrested for “inciting hatred,” “disseminating false 
news,” “promoting sectarianism,” and “calling for the regime’s overthrow in online forums.”

A number of persons have been arrested for posting online messages:
 Abbas Al-Murshid
 Mohamed Al-Maskati
 Ali Omid
 Fadel Al-Marzouk
 Hossein Abdalsjad Abdul Hossein Al-Abbas
 Jaffar Abdalsjad Abdul Hossein Al-Abbas
 Hamza Ahmed Youssef Al-Dairi
 Ahmed Youssef Al-Dairi
 Fadhel Abdulla Ali Al-Marzooq
 Hani Muslim Mohamed Al-Taif
 Ali Hassan Salman Al-Satrawi
 Abduljalil Al-Singace
 Ali Abdulemam

Social Media in Bahrain
Social media has played a role in fueling the unrest in Bahrain with "highly inflammatory" information, according to a report by the Bahrain Independent Commission of Inquiry (BICI). 

The Commission stated that it was "aware" of the impact of the use of social media websites, such as Facebook and Twitter, has had on some major social and political events in the contemporary world.

"The commission found numerous examples of exaggeration and misinformation, some highly inflammatory, that were disseminated through social media," the report stated.

Another issue raised in the findings was that mainstream media in Bahrain ignored views of opposition groups.

"The lack of access to mainstream media creates frustration within opposition groups and results in these groups resorting to other media such as social media," stated the report.

This, it said, could have a "destabilizing effect" because social media outlets were both untraceable and unaccountable.

The commission recommended the Bahrain government to relax censorship and allow the opposition greater access to television and radio broadcasts as well as print media.

Errors

The BICI team also met officials from Information Affairs Authority (IAA), who provided a file concerning the involvement of the international media in the events of February and March.

The IAA alleged that there was incitement practiced by some foreign media against Bahrain.

It also stated that the international media made factual errors when reporting on events.

"Much of this material contained derogatory language and inflammatory coverage of events, and some may have been defamatory,"said the BICI.

"However, the commission did not find any evidence of media coverage that constituted hate speech or incitement to violence."

See also
Telecommunications in Bahrain

References
This article incorporates text from the OpenNet Initiative's August 6, 2009 Bahrain profile, which is released under a Creative Commons Attribution 3.0 license.

External links